Jack Temple Kirby (August 22, 1938 – August 6, 2009) was an American historian who wrote about the Southern United States and the persistent stereotyping of Southerners. He was awarded the Bancroft Prize for his 2006 book Mockingbird Song: Ecological Landscapes of the South.

Early life and education
Kirby was born on August 22, 1938, in Portsmouth, Virginia, his ancestors having immigrated to the South in the 17th century, by family tradition. Throughout his college education he majored in history, earning his bachelor's degree at Old Dominion University and then attending the University of Virginia, where he was awarded a master's degree and a doctorate.

Professionally, Kirby was hired in 1965 to serve on the faculty of Miami University, where he was professor of history until his retirement in 2002. He also served as president of the Southern Historical Association.

In his published works — he authored or edited seven books — Kirby tried to dispel the sweeping generalizations of Southerners from books that he felt were aimed at "making Northern white folks feel good about themselves by telling the same story over and over again about the South". His 1978 book Media-Made Dixie took issue with the portrayal of Southerners using "clichés of racists, graceful landed gentry, poverty, homespun rural values, stock-car racers and moonshiners". Rather than focusing on the South as it really exists, the books show depictions from the dawn of the cinema and the creation of best seller lists, starting at D. W. Griffith's The Birth of a Nation.

His 2006 book Mockingbird Song: Ecological Landscapes of the South, published by the  University of North Carolina Press was awarded the Bancroft Prize in 2007 by jurors at Columbia University as a book that is set in the South but has far greater reach and speaks "profoundly on the relationships of Americans — and of humankind — to the natural world".

Personal
He relocated to St. Augustine, Florida following his retirement from Miami University.

Kirby died at age 70 of heart failure on August 6, 2009, in St. Augustine, Florida. He was survived by Dr. Constance Pierce, an English professor at Miami University who was Kirby's companion for 17 years, as well as by a daughter, a son and two grandchildren. His first marriage ended with his divorce of the former Ann Bulleit.

References

1938 births
2009 deaths
20th-century American historians
20th-century American male writers
Miami University faculty
Old Dominion University alumni
People from Portsmouth, Virginia
People from St. Augustine, Florida
University of Virginia alumni
Bancroft Prize winners
Historians from Virginia
Historians from Florida
American male non-fiction writers